Safir Mosque ( or ) is an old mosque in the city of Algiers, Algeria. It is located inside the UNESCO World Heritage inscribed medina quarter Casbah of Algiers. The design follows the Ottoman architectural style.

Etymology
The mosque was initially called as Jami Caid Safar bin Abdullah, but later it was renamed to Safir Mosque or Jami Safir after around 18th century. Safir of the name is considered as Safar bin Abdullah. Safar was originally a Christian slave who converted to Islam, learned Arabic and memorized the entire Qur'an; then freed and promoted general by Hayreddin Barbarossa.

History
The mosque was completed in 1534, in the place few meters away from the Mosque-Zawiya of Sidi Muhammad Sharif. The mosque was constructed on a land where was newly included into the medina after the establishment of new city walls in order to expand the quarter. The construction date is recorded in the book available in the mosque; the groundbreaking was in Rajab of 940 AH, and the completion is the second of Rabi' al-awwal in 941 AH, roughly equal to the 11 of September in 1534, which means the construction took nine months.

Notable Imams

See also
 Algerian Islamic reference
 Hizb Rateb (Hezzab, Bash Hezzab, Salka)
 Lists of mosques
 List of mosques in Africa
 List of mosques in Algeria

References

16th-century mosques
Casbah of Algiers
Ottoman mosques